Mesocacia pulla is an extinct species of beetle in the family Cerambycidae, that existed between the Lower and Middle Miocene. It was described by Zhang in 1989.

References

Mesosini
Beetles described in 1989